Several ships of the Italian Navy have been named Etna, after Mount Etna in Sicily:

 Italian cruiser Etna, the lead ship of a class of 1880s protected cruisers
 Italian cruiser Etna, an Etna-class cruiser originally ordered for the Thai Navy and subsequently requisitioned for service by the Italian Navy on the outbreak of World War II
 Italian ship Etna (A 5328), originally cargo ship USS Whitley (AKA-91), transferred to Italy in 1962
 Italian ship Etna (A 5326), a replenishment ship that entered service in 1998

See also
 , British ships
 Etna-class corvette, Napoleonic corvettes of France

Italian Navy ship names